A list of protected areas of Yemen:

Bura Community Protected Area 	 
Dhamar Montane Plains Mahjur Traditional Reserve	 	 
Jabal Bura Valley Forest National Park	
Ras Isa Marine Park	 
Socotra Island Protected Area	
Zuqur Islands Marine National Park

References
World Database on Protected Areas

 
Yemen
Protected areas